Katarzyna Sobieska (1634–1694) was the sister of King John III Sobieski of Poland and a noblewoman. She married Władysław Dominik Zasławski in 1650. She was later married to Michał Kazimierz Radziwiłł on 13 June 1658.

1634 births
1694 deaths
People from Zolochiv, Lviv Oblast
Katarzyna
17th-century Polish nobility